The 1991 NCAA Division I Indoor Track and Field Championships were contested to determine the individual and team national champions of men's and women's NCAA collegiate indoor track and field events in the United States, the 27th annual for men and 9th annual for women.

The championships were again held at the Hoosier Dome in Indianapolis, Indiana.

Seven-time defending champions Arkansas claimed the men's team title, the Razorbacks' eighth title and the eighth of twelve straight titles.

LSU won the women's team title, the Lady Tigers' third team title and third in five years.

Qualification
All teams and athletes from Division I indoor track and field programs were eligible to compete for this year's individual and team titles.

Team standings 
 Note: Top 10 only
 Scoring: 6 points for a 1st-place finish in an event, 4 points for 2nd, 3 points for 3rd, 2 points for 4th, and 1 point for 5th
 (DC) = Defending Champions

Men's title
 60 teams scored at least one point

Women's title
 39 teams scored at least one point

References

NCAA Indoor Track and Field Championships
Ncaa Indoor Track And Field Championships
Ncaa Indoor Track And Field Championships